Gavin Bruce Pearce (born 21 December 1967) is an Australian politician who has been a member of the House of Representatives since the 2019 federal election. He is a member of the Liberal Party and represents the Division of Braddon in Tasmania.

Early life
Pearce was born in Tasmania to a family which has "lived and farmed in the Sisters Creek region since the 1850s". He served in the army for 20 years, and was stationed in East Timor for a period. He later became the president of the Wynyard RSL branch. Prior to entering politics, Pearce farmed beef cattle at Lapoinya. He was vice-chair of the Yolla Producers Cooperative Society, based in Wynyard.

Politics
In October 2018, Pearce won Liberal preselection for the Division of Braddon. He had previously stood for preselection at the 2018 Braddon by-election, but was defeated by former Liberal MP Brett Whiteley.

At the 2019 federal election, Pearce defeated the incumbent Labor MP Justine Keay with a five-point swing on the two-party-preferred count. It is the third consecutive federal election in which the incumbent MP has been defeated in Braddon.

Pearce is a member of the National Right faction of the Liberal Party.

Pearce was re-elected at the 2022 Australian Federal Election with a +6.22% swing in the primary vote as well a +4.94% in the two-party-preferred result, despite the Liberal Party facing significant seat losses across Australia.

After the 2022 Federal Election and subsequent election of Peter Dutton as leader of the Liberal Party, Pearce was appointed to the Shadow ministry of Peter Dutton as Assistant Shadow Minister for Health, Aged Care and Indigenous Health Services which he has served in since 5 June 2022.

Personal life
Pearce met his first wife Amanda-Jane while they were both in the military. They had one son together before her death from lymphoma in 2009, aged 32. As of 2019, he was engaged to Megan McGinty with whom he has one daughter.

References

1967 births
Living people
Liberal Party of Australia members of the Parliament of Australia
Members of the Australian House of Representatives
Members of the Australian House of Representatives for Braddon
Australian farmers
Australian Army personnel
Military personnel from Tasmania